William Ellis may refer to:

Politicians
William Ellis (14th-century MP), in 1388, Member of Parliament for Canterbury
William Ellis (Secretary of State) (died 1732), English Jacobite, secretary of State to James II in exile
William Ellis (solicitor-general) (1609–1680), English lawyer and politician
William Craven-Ellis (1880–1959), Conservative Party politician in the United Kingdom
William Cox Ellis (1787–1871), member of the United States House of Representatives from Pennsylvania
William Henry Ellis (politician) (1819–1858), English-born political figure in Newfoundland
William R. Ellis (1850–1915), United States Congressman from Oregon from 1893–1899 and 1907–1911
William Thomas Ellis (1845–1925), U.S. Representative from Kentucky
William Ellis (Newfoundland politician) (1857–1926), building contractor and political figure in Newfoundland
William A. Ellis (1828–1900), member of the Wisconsin State Senate
William Ellis (mayor), mayor of Hoboken, New Jersey
William Ellis (Massachusetts politician), representative to the Great and General Court

Sportsmen
William Ellis (English cricketer) (1876–1931), English cricketer for Derbyshire
William Ellis (Scottish cricketer) (1923–2015), Scottish cricketer
William Webb Ellis (1806–1872), Anglican clergyman, allegedly the inventor of rugby football
Billy Ellis (1895–1939), English footballer
Bill Ellis (1919–2007), English cricketer

Religious figures
William Ellis (missionary) (1794–1872), English missionary and author
William Ellis (missionary in Newfoundland) (1780–1837), Irish-born Methodist clergyman, missionary in Newfoundland
William Webb Ellis (1806–1872), Anglican clergyman, allegedly the inventor of rugby football

Others
William Ellis (astronomer) (1828–1916), English astronomer and meteorologist
William Ellis (engraver) (1747–1810), English engraver
William Ellis (economist) (1800–1881), English businessman, writer on economics, and educational thinker
William Ellis (Medal of Honor) (1834–1875), American soldier and Medal of Honor recipient
William Ellis (writer on agriculture) (1700–1758), English writer on agriculture
Sir William Charles Ellis (1780–1839), English physician, pioneering superintendent of asylums and Methodist lay preacher
William Ellis (actor), British actor, voice artist and podcaster
William Henry Ellis (businessman) William Henry Ellis (1864–1923), was born into slavery and became a Mexican millionaire
William Henry Ellis (engineer) (1860–1945), British civil engineer and steel maker
William Hodgson Ellis (1845–1920), British-Canadian chemist
William Otoo Ellis, Vice Chancellor of the Kwame Nkrumah University of Science and Technology
William Edward Ellis (1908–1982), U.S. Navy officer
W. H. Ellis (1867–1948), justice of the Florida Supreme Court
William Wade Ellis (1751–1779), naturalist and artist who accompanied Captain Cook

See also
William Henry Ellis (disambiguation)
William Ellis School, a UK secondary comprehensive school for boys in Highgate, London